Rehras Sahib (pronunciation: , lit. “the way”), commonly known as So dar Rehras, is the daily evening prayer of the Sikhs and is part of Nitnem. It includes hymns from Guru Granth Sahib Ji and Dasam Granth Ji.

It contains hymns of So Dar, So Purakh, Chaupai Sahib, a concise version of Anand Sahib, and Mundhavani, among which Chaupai Sahib is from the Dasam Granth Ji. This Bani is a collection of hymns of five Sikh Gurus: Guru Nanak Dev Ji, Guru Amar Das Ji, Guru Ram Das Ji, Guru Arjan Dev Ji and Guru Gobind Singh Ji.

See also
 Guru Granth Sahib Ji
 SGPC
 Dasam Granth Ji

References

External links 
 Complete Rehras Sahib (PDF)
 Rehras Sahib Bani in Punjabi
 Rehras Sahib Bani in Hindi

Adi Granth
Sikh terminology
Sikh scripture
Sikh prayer